Nicanor G. Tiongson is a critic, creative writer and academic from the Philippines. He holds a Bachelor of Humanities degree from the Ateneo de Manila University, and M.A. and Ph.D. in Philippine Studies from the University of the Philippines. A founding member of the Manunuri ng Pelikulang Pilipino, Tiongson is currently Professor Emeritus of Film and Audio-visual Communication at the College of Mass Communication in U.P. Diliman.

Tiongson was a Visiting Professor at Osaka University of Foreign Studies in Japan; and Fulbright Visiting Professor at the University of California, Berkeley; University of Michigan; University of California, Los Angeles; and University of Hawaii at Manoa. Tiongson also received an Australian Cultural Award for his extensive research on Philippine culture, resulting in two works on Philippine drama: Kasaysayan at Estetika ng Sinakulo at Ibang Dulang Panrelihiyon sa Malolos and Kasaysayan ng Komedya sa Pilipinas.

Tiongson was vice-president and artistic director of the Cultural Center of the Philippines (CCP) from 1986 to 1994.

Tiongson was also the Philippine Director of Sangandaan 2003, a cultural commemoration that highlighted the arts and media produced by Filipinos, Americans and Filipino-Americans in the course of Philippine-U.S. relations from 1899 to 2002. 

During his short term as Director of the Movie and Television Review and Classification Board (MTRCB), Tiongson played a role in the controversy surrounding a film popularly known as Live Show. The film, directed by Jose Javier Reyes, focused on performing women and men who engaged in sex acts onstage at some night clubs in the Manila area. Live Show was banned after Cardinal Archbishop Jaime Sin of Manila denounced the film and labeled it "immoral" and "in violation of the campaign for moral reform." Tiongson resigned shortly after Philippine President Gloria Macapagal Arroyo banned Live Show, and noted his conviction that the President had been pressured by influential Filipino members of the Catholic Church.

Tiongson has taught Philippine literature, theater, and general culture at the University of the Philippines, the Ateneo de Manila University, De La Salle University-Manila, the University of Hawaii and the Osaka University of Foreign Studies. He also taught Filipino and Philippine literature at the College of Arts and Letters, University of the Philippines from 1974 to 1986. Among the books he edited are: The Cultural Traditional Media of ASEAN, The Urian Anthology, the Politics of Culture: The Philippine Experience, Tuklas Sining, and the 10-volume CCP Encyclopedia of Philippine Art. For his publications, he has received five National Book Awards from the Manila Critics Circle and two Surian ng Wikang Pambansa awards.

Tiongson was criticized for his opposition to the proposal of bestowing the National Artist honor to the late Dolphy. The incident was vividly recalled by National Artist for Theater Cecilia Guidote-Alvarez wherein Tiongson "stood violently" and protested passionately on the proposal. Tiongson admitted that he had reservations on the installation of Dolphy with the prestigious award. Tiongson wrote: “I believed that the two icons he created for film and TV – the screaming gay and the happy-go-lucky poor man – have, in the majority of his movies, equated gayness with abnormality and mindless frivolity on the one hand, and romanticized or deodorized poverty on the other.”

Works

Books

Political, Social and Cultural Studies
Four values in Filipino Drama and Film 
The Cultural Traditional Media of ASEAN
The Urian Anthology, 1970-1979, 1980
Kasaysayan ng Komedya sa Pilipinas, 1766-1982, 1982
Politics of Culture: The Philippine Experience, 1985
Tuklas Sining: Essays on Philippine Arts, 1992
Philippine Theater: A History and Anthology. Volume I: Rituals, Dances and Playlets, 1999
Philippine Theater: A History and Anthology. Volume II: Komedya, 1999
Philippine Theater: A History and Anthology. Volume IV: Sarswela and Dance, 1999
Philippine Theater: A History and Anthology. Volume V: Modern Plays, 1999
The Women of Malolos, 2004
Plaridel : Journal of Philippine Communication, Media and Society, February 2004 Vol.1, No.1. (coedited with Violeda A. Umali)

Drama
Philippines Circa 1907, 1985

Encyclopedia
CCP Encyclopedia of Philippine Art, 1994

Dance Librettos
Adarna
Realizing Rama
Siete Dolores

Honors and awards
Visiting Professor, Osaka University of Foreign Studies, Japan
Visiting Professor, University of Hawaii at Manoa
Visiting Professor, University of California, Berkeley
Visiting Professor, University of Michigan
Visiting Professor, University of California, Los Angeles
National Book Awards from the Manila Critics Circle
Surian ng Wikang Pambansa (Komisyon ng mga Wika ng Pilipinas) Awards
Fulbright Exchange Professorship
Australian Cultural Award
U.P. Gawad Chancellor for Outstanding Teacher (Professor Level)

References

External links
National Book Awards
Asiaweek
Tagalog On Site (archived version)
University Record, The University of Michigan
Manunuri ng Pelikulang Pilipino

Living people
Filipino writers
Tagalog-language writers
Year of birth missing (living people)
Ateneo de Manila University alumni
Academic staff of Ateneo de Manila University
Academic staff of Osaka University
University of the Philippines alumni
Academic staff of the University of the Philippines